2001 Live may refer to:

NBA Live 2001
Styx World: Live 2001